Berlin Middle High School (formerly Berlin High School) is a public, co-educational high school located in Berlin, New Hampshire, that was established in 1884–1885. It serves the city of Berlin as well as the towns of Dummer, Errol, and Milan. During its lifetime, the school has been in four different buildings, two of them burning down. The fourth and newest building, on Willard Street, was built in 1972. The school was renamed "Berlin Middle High School" in 2019.

Notable alumni
Dennis "Red" Gendron, men's hockey head coach University of Maine
Donna Bailey, attorney and Maine state senator

References

Gallery

External links
 
 Berlin New Hampshire History at weebly.com

Berlin, New Hampshire
Schools in Coös County, New Hampshire
Public high schools in New Hampshire